Ladislau Csillag (8 February 1896 – 29 October 1971) was a Romanian professional footballer and manager of Hungarian ethnicity. As a footballer, Csillag played for Terézváros and Club Atletic Oradea. After retirement, Csillag was the manager of Crișana Oradea, Juventus București, Gloria CFR Arad and Club Atletic Oradea, among others.

International career
Ladislau Csillag played one friendly game for Romania, when he came as a substitute and replaced Károly Weichelt at half-time in a 4–1 away loss against Czechoslovakia.

Honours

Player
CA Oradea
Regional Championship: 1923–24, 1924–25

Manager
Crișana Oradea
Regional Championship: 1930–31, 1931–32

References

External links

Ladislau Csillag at nela.hu

1896 births
1971 deaths
Sportspeople from Győr
Romanian footballers
Romanian sportspeople of Hungarian descent
Association football midfielders
Romania international footballers
Liga I players
Liga II players
Nemzeti Bajnokság I players
Nemzeti Bajnokság II players
CA Oradea players
Romanian football managers
FC Petrolul Ploiești managers
CA Oradea managers
FC Sportul Studențesc București managers